Kim You-ri (born ) is a South Korean female  track cyclist. She won the bronze medal in the  team pursuit  at the 2016 Asian Cycling Championships.

Career results
2016
3rd  Team Pursuit, Asian Track Championships (with Lee Ju-hee, Kang Hyeong-Yeong and Son Eun-ju)
2017
Asian Track Championships
3rd  Points Race
3rd  Team Pursuit (with Lee Ju-mi, Kang Hyeong-Yeong and Son Eun-ju)

References

External links
 
 
 

1987 births
Living people
South Korean track cyclists
South Korean female cyclists
Place of birth missing (living people)
Cyclists at the 2014 Asian Games
Cyclists at the 2018 Asian Games
Asian Games medalists in cycling
Medalists at the 2014 Asian Games
Medalists at the 2018 Asian Games
Asian Games gold medalists for South Korea
Asian Games silver medalists for South Korea
Asian Games bronze medalists for South Korea
20th-century South Korean women
21st-century South Korean women